In arithmetic, a hundredth is a single part of something that has been divided equally into a hundred parts.  For example, a hundredth of 675 is 6.75. In this manner it is used with the prefix "centi" such as in centimeter.

A hundredth is the reciprocal of 100.

A hundredth is written as a decimal fraction as 0.01, and as a vulgar fraction as 1/100.

“Hundredth” is also the ordinal number that follows “ninety-ninth” and precedes “hundred and first.” It is written as 100th.

See also
Basis point
Cent (currency)
Cent (music)
Hundredth is an American rock band from Myrtle Beach, South Carolina, that formed in 2008.
Order of magnitude (numbers)
Orders of magnitude
Percentage
Point (gemstone)

Fractions (mathematics)
Rational numbers